Ópusztaszer (till 1974 Sövényháza) is a village in Csongrád county, in the Southern Great Plain region of southern Hungary. It is most known as the location of the Ópusztaszer National Heritage Park.

Geography

External links

  in Hungarian
 Hungarian Travel Info - Ópusztaszer
 Aerial photographs of Ópusztaszer

Populated places in Csongrád-Csanád County